John Knill (17331811), was Mayor of St Ives, Cornwall, England.

John Knill may also refer to:
 Frank John Knill, British Marine, winner of the Conspicuous Gallantry Medal
 John Knill (MP) for Radnorshire
 Sir (John) Stuart Knill, 2nd Baronet (18561934), see Knill Baronets
 Sir John Kenelm Stuart Knill, 4th Baronet (19131998), see Knill Baronets